Ivano Vendrame (born 19 May 1997) is an Italian swimmer. He competed in the men's 100 metre freestyle event at the 2017 World Aquatics Championships.

References

External links
 

1997 births
Living people
Italian male freestyle swimmers
Place of birth missing (living people)
Universiade medalists in swimming
European Aquatics Championships medalists in swimming
European Championships (multi-sport event) silver medalists
Universiade silver medalists for Italy
Swimmers at the 2015 European Games
European Games medalists in swimming
European Games silver medalists for Italy
Medalists at the 2017 Summer Universiade
Medalists at the 2019 Summer Universiade